The 2017 AIBA Youth Women's World Boxing Championships were held in Guwahati, India, from 19 to 26 November 2017. The competition is under the supervision of the world's governing body for amateur boxing AIBA and is the junior version of the World Amateur Boxing Championships. Boxers aged between 17 and 18 as of 1 January 2017 were eligible to compete.

Medal winners

Medal table

Participating nations
160 athletes from 31 nations competed.

See also
AIBA Youth World Boxing Championships

References

2017 in boxing
Women
Boxing competitions in India
2017 in Indian sport